Ocnaea sequoia is a species of small-headed flies in the family Acroceridae.

References

Acroceridae
Articles created by Qbugbot
Insects described in 1948
Taxa named by Curtis Williams Sabrosky